Arena Football is a 1988 Commodore 64 video game written by Chris R. Bickford III. It is the first Arena or Indoor Football game. It is a text-based simulation that allows the user to pick a play for their team (on defense or offense) and the computer simulates the results of the play based on real-life data and tendencies of the actual team.

Gameplay

The game includes all six teams in the AFL at the time; Chicago, Pittsburgh, Detroit, Los Angeles, New England, and New York.

Legacy
In 1993, Arena Football was re-programmed and added 8 more teams to the original six including; Maryland, Denver, Tampa Bay, New Orleans, Albany, Orlando, Dallas, and Columbus. It is to this day, the only Arena Football game to include the Maryland Commandos.

References

External links

Arena Football screenshots

Commodore 64 games
Commodore 64-only games
1988 video games
1993 video games
Arena football video games
Multiplayer and single-player video games
Video games developed in the United States